Inam-ul-Haq (born 7 January 1979) is a Pakistani-born cricketer who plays for the Qatar national cricket team. He played first-class cricket for several domestic teams in Pakistan between 1997 and 2012. He was also a part of Pakistan's squad for the 1998 Under-19 Cricket World Cup. In 2017, he captained Qatar in the 2017 ICC World Cricket League Division Five tournament.

He made his Twenty20 International (T20I) debut for Qatar against Saudi Arabia on 21 January 2019 in the 2019 ACC Western Region T20 tournament.

References

External links
 

1979 births
Living people
Pakistani cricketers
Qatari cricketers
Qatar Twenty20 International cricketers
Gujranwala cricketers
Sialkot cricketers
Zarai Taraqiati Bank Limited cricketers
Cricketers from Sialkot
Pakistani emigrants to Qatar
Pakistani expatriates in Qatar